The word 火車 literally means "fire cart", "fire chariot", or "fire vehicle" in Chinese, Korean and Japanese, and may refer to:

In Chinese:
East Rail line, a rapid transit line in Hong Kong previously known as 
Train, a rail-based vehicle
Steam locomotive

In Korean:
Hwacha, a multiple rocket launcher
Helpless (2012 film), South Korean film originally released as Hwacha

In Japanese:
Kasha (folklore), a yōkai in Japanese folklore
All She Was Worth, Japanese crime novel originally released as